Fairlane Green also known as "The Hill", is a power center in the United States city of Allen Park, Michigan. It is built on top of a former landfill and was opened to the public in stages in the mid-2000s. Tenants include Target, Meijer, Best Buy, LA Fitness, Old Navy, Five Below, Panera Bread, and several others.

The elevation of Fairlane Green is high enough to allow one to see portions of the skyline of downtown Detroit from the northern end of the complex on most days.

History
Prior to the construction of Fairlane Green, there was only one large shopping development within the city of Allen Park, the Lincoln Park Shopping Center, anchored by Sears, and even then only a small portion was actually within Allen Park, the majority of it lying in adjacent Lincoln Park.

Development of what became Fairlane Green began in December 2002, when Ford Land Development, the real-estate division of the Ford Motor Company, received a special use permit to redevelop a former clay mine that extended from Outer Drive and Snow Avenue to Oakwood Boulevard and ran parallel to M-39 and Interstate 94. The original proposal, which also included recreational facilities, was approved in August 2003. Ford Land had intended the complex to anchor the southern gateway to the Fairlane corridor through Allen Park and Dearborn, including the Fairlane Town Center mall.

In May 2004, the portion of the complex site that included the former site of the Allen Park Veterans Administration Medical Center was sold to Lormax Stern and REDICO, which became Independence Marketplace. Construction began on both centers a few months later.

Target was the first to open on October 9, 2005, joined by several other tenants, including those that relocated from the Lincoln Park Shopping Center, including Barnes & Noble, Dress Barn, Lane Bryant, Longhorn Steakhouse, Michaels Arts & Crafts, Old Navy, On-The-Border Mexican Restaurant, Pier 1 Imports, T.J. Maxx, Cost Plus World Market and Bed, Bath & Beyond.

A second phase, which includes Meijer, Best Buy, LA Fitness, and The Home Depot, opened in 2007. The recreational elements of the second phase, however, were never built. Cost Plus World Market closed in the late 2000s and was replaced by Five Below.

References

Shopping malls in Wayne County, Michigan
Shopping malls established in 2005
2005 establishments in Michigan